The 1924 Tennessee Docs football team (variously "Docs", "UT Doctors" or the "Tennessee Medicos") represented the University of Tennessee College of Medicine in Memphis in the 1924 college football season. The team gave Centenary its season's only loss.

Schedule

References

Tennessee Docs
Tennessee Docs football seasons
Tennessee Docs football